Oliver Lloyd (c. 1527 – probably 1589), of Leighton, Montgomeryshire, was a Welsh politician from Pontyclun.

He was a Member (MP) of the Parliament of England for Montgomeryshire in 1586.

References

1520s births
1589 deaths
16th-century Welsh politicians
English MPs 1586–1587
Members of the Parliament of England (pre-1707) for constituencies in Wales